The Vesper is a cocktail that was originally made of gin, vodka, and Kina Lillet. Since that form of Lillet is no longer produced, modern bartenders need to modify the recipe to mimic the original taste.

The drink was popularized by author Ian Fleming (1908–1964) in his 1953 novel Casino Royale in which the character James Bond invents the recipe and names the cocktail. Fleming's Bond calls it a "special martini", and though it lacks the vermouth that defined a martini in Fleming's day it is sometimes called a Vesper martini.

Unlike the vodka martini and the mojito, popularized by previous Bond films, the Vesper did not become a familiar cocktail, likely because the Kina Lillet and later the substitute Lillet Blanc, were not widely distributed. Fleming judged it "unpalatable".

History
In Ian Fleming's Casino Royale, the first of his works to feature James Bond, Bond orders a dry martini in a "deep champagne goblet" but then changes his order and gives the barman a recipe. The dialogue is:

Bond deems the result "excellent" and calls it a "special martini". Later in the novel, after being introduced to the beautiful Vesper Lynd, Bond tells Vesper that his search for a name is over if she will permit him to name the drink after her.

The cocktail was not Fleming's creation. It was devised by his friend Ivar Bryce as evidenced by the words Fleming inscribed in Bryce's copy of Casino Royale: "For Ivar, who mixed the first Vesper and said the good word." Naming a cocktail the Vesper was Fleming's idea though he drew inspiration from someone else's joke. He had encountered the term at evening drinks when a butler announced: "Vespers are served." Fleming adapted this pun on the name of the religious observance normally held about sunset, "Vespers". And Bond alludes to this by praising his cocktail's name as "very appropriate to the violet hour when my cocktail will now be drunk all over the world".

Just as the character Vesper Lynd dies in Casino Royale, the cocktail named for her makes no appearance in any of Fleming's later Bond novels. Fleming, in a letter to The Guardian in 1958, said that when he tasted a Vesper for the first time "several months" after including it in his novel, he found it "unpalatable".

Although the production of Kina Lillet ceased in 1986, in the 2006 film Casino Royale, Bond gives the barman the same recipe as he does in the novel. When Vesper asks Bond if he named the drink after her "because of the bitter aftertaste", Bond replies that he did so "because once you have tasted it, you won't drink anything else."

The Vesper, including its original recipe recited by a barman, appeared again in the film Quantum of Solace (2008), a sequel to Casino Royale based on the Bond character but no specific work of Fleming's.

Unlike the vodka martini and the mojito, popularized by the Bond films Dr. No (1962) and Die Another Day (2003), respectively, the Vesper did not become a familiar cocktail, likely because the Kina Lillet and later the substitute Lillet Blanc, were not widely distributed.

Contemporary versions
Because the production of Kina Lillet, "a fruit-and-spice flavoured apéritif wine from Bordeaux, ceased in 1986, the original recipe can no longer be used to reproduce the Fleming-Bond cocktail faithfully. Substitute ingredients attempt to recapture the original flavor of the drink.

The International Bartenders Association (IBA) recipe calls for 45 ml gin, 15 ml vodka, and 7.5 ml Lillet Blanc in place of Kina Lillet. Others find Lillet Blanc an inadequate substitute for Kina Lillet, as it lacks the latter's quinine which added a distinctive taste, while Kingsley Amis thought the original drink too bitter and improved by substituting Lillet Blanc. Another alternative to Lillet is Cocchi Americano, a similar aromatised wine, which results in a more bitter finish than Lillet Blanc. Another suggested substitute is Kina L'Aéro d'Or. In 2006, Esquire suggested adding quinine powder to replace what Lillet Blanc lacks, or as a last resort ("in desperation") adding bitters. 

Less attention has focused on the other spirits and their alcohol content, but both Tanqueray and Stolichnaya are sometimes mentioned.

Although Bond drinks the first Vesper from a "deep glass", presumably the "deep champagne goblet" he specified when ordering a martini before substituting the Vesper's recipe, cocktail glasses are commonly used in modern versions of this drink, as Esquire and the IBA recommend.

See also
 List of cocktails

Notes

References
 

1953 introductions
Cocktails with gin
Cocktails with vodka
Casino Royale (novel)